Eliza Comes to Stay is a 1936 British comedy film directed by Henry Edwards and starring Betty Balfour, Seymour Hicks and Oscar Asche. It was made at the Riverside Studios in Hammersmith.

Cast
 Betty Balfour as Eliza Vandan  
 Seymour Hicks as Sandy Verrall  
 Oscar Asche as Herbert  
 Ellis Jeffreys as Lady Elizabeth  
 Nelson Keys as Sir Gregory  
 A.R. Whatmore as Monty Jordan  
 Vera Bogetti as Vera Laurence  
 Ben Webster
 Donald Burr 
 Agnes Imlay
 Diana Ward 
 Bill Worth

References

Bibliography
 Low, Rachael. Filmmaking in 1930s Britain. George Allen & Unwin, 1985.
 Wood, Linda. British Films, 1927-1939. British Film Institute, 1986.

External links

1936 films
British comedy films
1936 comedy films
Films directed by Henry Edwards
Films shot at Riverside Studios
British black-and-white films
1930s English-language films
1930s British films